Cleaner is a 2007 American thriller film directed by Renny Harlin. It stars Samuel L. Jackson as a crime scene cleaner who thinks he has become part of a cover-up; Ed Harris, Keke Palmer, and Eva Mendes also star. The film was released on May 27, 2007.

Plot
 
Tom Cutler is a single father and a retired police officer who now runs his own crime scene cleaning service. Eight years earlier Tom’s wife had been murdered when she tried to stop a home invasion and robbery, leaving their then-six-year-old daughter Rose to witness her death.

One day Tom’s company receives a work order to clean the scene of a wealthy home. When he arrives his notes indicate a key is hidden under a clay pot on the front porch. He lets himself in, catalogues the crime scene and proceeds to clean up the blood and tissue using his own special mixture of chemicals.

The next morning he finds the house key in his coat pocket and realizes he forgot to place it back under the pot. He goes back to the home, but the home owner, Ann Norcut, seems to have no idea that Tom had been there the previous day, let alone know any reason why his services would be needed. Tom claims he mixed up addresses. Nevertheless, the two separately grow suspicious of the situation.

Returning to his office, Tom inquires with his assistant about the work order for the Norcut’s home. He learns that the police never placed such a work order, nor is there a detective named Jones, who had apparently placed the order. Tom then stashes the order, the crime scene photos, his audio notes, and the house key in an envelope then locks them away. He seeks out his friend and former partner Eddie Lorenzo, where he begins to learn that Ann’s husband John is apparently missing. Eddie is suspicious of foul play, given that John’s disappearance came the day before he was set to testify to a grand jury against corrupt former police commissioner Robert Vaughn.

The next day, Tom finds Ann waiting for him at his office where she inquires about his visit the previous day. Saying he never answered what sort of cleaning services he provides, she deduces it’s specifically crime scene clean up, and asks whether her husband was killed. Tom declines to give a clear answer.

Eddie later finds Tom cleaning a scene in a hotel room, and tells him that while the forensic team found no traces of DNA evidence at the scene, they did find professional cleaning chemicals. Tom reveals the situation he’s in to Eddie, saying that he hasn't contacted the police because he's not sure how far and wide Vaughn's corruption goes. Later, Tom meets with Ann who shows him a ledger John was keeping that listed the badge number of every corrupt officer on Vaughn’s payroll—including, unbeknownst to her, Tom’s. Years earlier, Tom had agreed to do a job for Vaughn, believing it would keep Rose safe.

Tom tells Eddie about the ledger and Eddie suggests that Tom destroy it because it suggests motive for Tom to murder John, and given that Tom can already be placed at the scene, the revelation of a motive may be enough to convict him.

Tom returns to Ann who is experiencing PTSD knowing that her living room is the scene of her husband’s murder. She asks to be taken somewhere, and so Tom takes her to his employee Miguel’s home, where they have dinner with him and his family.

Tom learns that Ann has been asked to visit the morgue by Detective Jim Vargas who has been investigating John’s murder. He slips her into the morgue before Vargas arrives, where she’s able to identify John’s remains. In private, the coroner tells Tom that the victim had a vasectomy several years prior, indicating that Ann’s aforementioned pregnancy couldn’t have been his.

Tom deduces that Ann was having an affair, and that the key left for him on the porch belonged to her boyfriend. Seeking out Eddie’s help again, he explains what he’s learned; before leaving Eddie’s, he notices a plaque over the fireplace thanking him for his service in after school programs and Ann’s name is inscribed at the bottom. Tom realizes Eddie is Ann’s lover, and that the child was his.

Eddie, believing that John had forced Ann to have an abortion, had murdered John and then brought in Tom to clean up the scene, knowing that he would be destroying all the evidence. Tom decides to hand Eddie over to Vargas, but Eddie instead goes to Tom's home with Rose. Tom hurries home and confronts Eddie, who admits he killed John believing that Ann was lying about the miscarriage and that John made her terminate the pregnancy. Holding Tom at gunpoint he angrily pleads for support, but when he sees patrol vehicles arrive on the scene, he aims to shoot Tom. Instead, Rose shoots Eddie in the head and kills him, having run and retrieved Tom’s sidearm.

Vargas takes the ledger from Tom, thanks him, and tells him he'll burn the book, and they'll all sleep better.  Vargas states he'll clean up the mess, letting Tom go.  Miguel cleans up the crime scene.

Cast

 Samuel L. Jackson as Tom Cutler
 Ed Harris as Eddie Lorenzo
 Eva Mendes as Ann Norcut
 Luis Guzmán as Jim Vargas
 Maggie Lawson as Cherie
 Jose Pablo Cantillo as Miguel
 Keke Palmer as Rose Cutler
 Robert Forster as Arlo Grange

Reception
On Rotten Tomatoes the film has an approval rating of 17% based on 12 reviews, with an average rating of 4.3/10. On Metacritic the film has a weighted average score of 49 out of 100, based on four critics, indicating "mixed or average reviews".

Michael Rechtshaffen of The Hollywood Reporter gave it a positive review and wrote: "A neatly contained crime whodunit with a nifty setup and an expert lead performance from Samuel L. Jackson."

Eddie Cockrell of Variety wrote: "Scrub away a needlessly fussy visual style, trendy narrative tweaks and a climax both morally repugnant and logically absurd, and there's a tough little noir about buried transgressions coming out of the past in Renny Harlin's lackluster thriller Cleaner. Too mainstream to attract genre interest, and too tangled in its character motivations to sit well with the multiplex crowd, this is a minor stain that should fade quickly and leave only faint traces in ancillary."

Home media 
Cleaner was released on May 27, 2008, in the U.S. and opened at #5 and sold 75,312 DVD units, which gathered revenue of $1.5 million. It went on to sell 402,010 DVDs, which translated to revenues of $7.8 million.

References

External links
 

2007 films
American crime thriller films
2000s English-language films
2007 crime thriller films
Screen Gems films
Films directed by Renny Harlin
Films produced by Steve Golin
Films scored by Richard Gibbs
2000s American films